Photon diffusion equation is a second order partial differential equation describing the time behavior of photon fluence rate distribution in a low-absorption high-scattering medium.

Its mathematical form is as follows.

Its main difference with diffusion equation in physics is that photon diffusion equation has an absorption term in it.

Application

Medical Imaging
The properties of photon diffusion as explained by the equation is used in diffuse optical tomography.

External links
 Diffuse Optics Lab at University of Pennsylvania, Philadelphia, USA

Equations